Kaathala Kaathala is a 1998 Indian Tamil-language romantic comedy film directed by Singeetam Srinivasa Rao and produced by P. L. Thenappan. The film stars Kamal Haasan, Prabhu Deva, Soundarya and Rambha. It revolves around two men falling in love with two women, but end up creating a web of lies trying to impress their lovers' fathers.

Kaathala Kaathala was initially expected to be directed by K. S. Ravikumar, but he was replaced by Rao after he refused to sign the film until the Film Employees Federation of South India (FEFSI) strike of 1997 had stopped. The film was released on 10 April 1998, to positive reviews and became a commercial success. It was later loosely remade in Hindi as Housefull (2010).

Plot 
Ramalingam and Sundaralingam are orphans who take care of orphaned children. Sundaralingam paints shop banners and calendars. Ramalingam makes money usually by fraudulent means. Sundari, an arts student, falls for Ramalingam. Her friend Janaki falls in love with Sundaralingam. Janaki's father Paramasivam objects to Janaki's wedding since Sundaralingam is poor, prompting Janaki and Sundaralingam to marry with the help of their friends.

Days go by, but Paramasivam still does not agree. This causes Sundari to ask Janaki to lie to Paramasivam that she has given birth to a son. Paramasivam, upon receiving the letter, changes his mind and gets ready to set off to Chennai. Sundari lies to her Chicago-based father Balamurugan that Ramalingam is a rich man. Janaki, to easily convince her parents, also fabricates a story that Sundaralingam has become rich. The girls rent a bungalow for three days; the owner Noorjahan mistakes Janaki and Ramalingam to be a couple.

Balamurugan, who is supposed to come on that day, misses his flight and is unable to come over. Janaki's parents wish to surprise her, and they end up coming on that day. Ramalingam mistakes Janaki's father to be Sundari's father, and a comedy of errors ensues. Unable to tell the truth because of Noorjahan's presence, Janaki and Ramalingam let the mistaken identity stay as such. To keep the tale running, Janaki and Ramalingam introduce Sundari as the maidservant and Sundaralingam as the cook. Sundari borrows a child from a beggar woman, who stays in the house as the woman who supplies milk.

The four of them strive hard to hide the truth from Janaki's parents. While these happenings unfold, Varadhachaari, Paramasivam's friend, who knows the truth, comes over. The couples try to salvage the web of lies they have built, by skilfully getting Varadhachaari and Paramasivam to agree. Unfortunately, they then meet with Janaki's maternal uncle Singaram, a doubting Thomas, who begins to suspect the veracity of the stories of the youths. All the same, he fails to convince his sister and brother-in-law of the possible untruths they have been led to believe.

Now that Balamurugan too is about to meet them, Paramasivam himself steps in to help them build a story involving Balamurugan's daughter, who, to him, is a maidservant in the house. He concocts a complicated tale where Ramalingam is his son, Janaki and Sundaralingam reprise their real relationship and, worse, V. Anand, the former godman Ananda Vikadanantha, to be his cousin. The real reason Anand is at their place, is to hide from the police, as he is wanted for his fraudulent ways. Soon enough, the elders begin to smell something fishy. To end the mess, Sundari reveals the complete truth to everyone. Singaram reveals to all that Anand is a crook and Ramalingam is now forced to prove his innocence.

A chase ensues when Anand is held hostage by his ex-partner Junior Vikadanantha for money which he looted. Inspector Chokkalingam arrives in time to find Ananda Vikadanantha and Junior, and Ramalingam is proven innocent. Paramasivam accepts Janaki and Sundaralingam, and Balamurugan is happy about Ramalingam and Sundari.

Cast 

 Kamal Haasan as Ramalingam
 Prabhu Deva as Sundaralingam
 Soundarya as Sundari
 Rambha as Janaki
 Vadivelu as Singaaram
 Delhi Ganesh as the landlord
 Moulee as Balamurugan
 Cho as Varadhachaari
 Nagesh as Chokkalingam
 Srividya as Parvathy
 S. N. Lakshmi as Noorjahan
 Kovai Sarala as Junior Vikadanantha's wife
 V. M. C. Haneefa as Vikadanantha (V. Anand)
 M. S. Viswanathan as Paramasivam
 Crazy Mohan as Junior Vikadanantha
 Ajay Rathnam as Williamson
 C. K. Saraswathi as Bhangaru Mrs Dhamodhar Naidu

Production 
Kaathala Kaathala was initially expected to be directed by K. S. Ravikumar who directed the successful Avvai Shanmugi with Kamal Haasan in the lead earlier, but he was later replaced by Singeetam Srinivasa Rao after he refused to sign the film until the Film Employees Federation of South India (FEFSI) strike of 1997 had stopped. Actresses Meena and Simran's unavailability led to Rambha being cast in a lead role. Nagma also opted against signing the film fearing that a potential clash may arise with actress Rambha, after the pair's alleged fall out on the sets of Janakiraman. After Soundarya's death in 2004, Haasan paid tribute to her when he said, "she came forward to do the movie, when the rest of the industry was unwilling to work with me." Cho Ramaswamy, wanting to express solidarity with Haasan's stand during the strike, asked him for a role in the film and got it.

Soundtrack 

The soundtrack was composed by Karthik Raja and lyrics written by Vaali.

Release and reception 
Kaathala Kaathala was released on 10 April 1998. Namma Ooru Velan from Indolink gave the film a positive review, citing that "if one can put the inspirations behind, the movie is quite enjoyable" and that "the going gets very complicated and absolutely hilarious". A critic from Dinakaran noted "writers like [Crazy] Mohan make this celluloid affair of filmy entertainment stand on a more fanciful ground of pure comedy --- with ease and veritable success". Ji of Kalki, however, reviewed the film more negatively, criticising it for lacking the humour of Haasan and Mohan's previous ventures. The film was dubbed in Telugu as Navvandi Lavvandi in late 1998.

In 2010, the producer of the film P. L. Thenappan threatened legal action against the makers of the Hindi film Housefull for remaking scenes from the film without permission. Thenappan revealed he had dubbed the film into Hindi in the late 1990s as Mirchi Masala, but the version did not release.

Legacy 
The line "Jaanaki enakku wife aagittathaala, Sundari velakkaari aayittaappaa" (Ever since Janaki became my wife, Sundari became a housemaid) became popular, and has since entered Tamil vernacular as a term used by people to "tease friends caught impersonating". The song "Kaasumela" became popular for Prabhu Deva's dance. The title of the song inspired a film of the same name.

References

External links 
 

1998 films
1998 romantic comedy films
Films directed by Singeetam Srinivasa Rao
Films with screenplays by Crazy Mohan
Films with screenplays by Kamal Haasan
Films scored by Karthik Raja
Indian romantic comedy films